Nancy Creek is a stream near Cartersville in Bartow County, Georgia, United States.

Nancy Creek was probably named for a Native American (Indian) woman.

References

Rivers of Bartow County, Georgia
Rivers of Georgia (U.S. state)